The Late Breakfasters is a novel by English writer Robert Aickman, first published in the United Kingdom in 1964 by Victor Gollancz. It was reprinted by Chivers in 1978 and by Faber & Faber in 2014.  It is the only novel published by the author in his lifetime.

References

1964 British novels
English novels
Victor Gollancz Ltd books